This is a list of notable Irish people who were born on the island of Ireland, in either the Republic of Ireland or Northern Ireland, and have lived there for most of their lives. Also included on the list are people who were not born in Ireland, but have been raised as Irish, have lived there for most of their lives or in regards to the Republic of Ireland, have adopted Irish citizenship (e.g., Daniel Day-Lewis). The names are sorted by surname.

Art

Architecture 

 George Ashlin
 Angela Brady
 George Drumgoole Coleman
 Sir Thomas Drew
 Yvonne Farrell
 Eileen Gray
 James Hoban – designer of the White House
 Francis Johnston
 Sheila O'Donnell
 Thomas Parke
 Edward Lovett Pearce
 Kevin Roche
 Michael Scott

Actors 

 Sara Allgood – actress
 Jonas Armstrong – actor, star of the BBC series Robin Hood
 Caitríona Balfe – actress
 Spranger Barry – actor
 Patrick Bergin – film actor
 Sarah Bolger – actress, played Princess Mary Tudor in The Tudors; Spiderwick Chronicles; Princess Aurora in Once Upon a Time
 Stephen Boyd – film actor
 Kenneth Branagh – actor on stage, film and TV, the Harry Potter movies
 Brid Brennan – actress
 George Brent – Hollywood actor
 Harry Brogan – actor
 Shane Brolly – actor, Underworld Franchise
 Pierce Brosnan – actor, best known as James Bond from 1994 to 2005
 Gabriel Byrne – TV and film actor
 Todd Carty – TV, stage and film actor and director
 Elaine Cassidy – film actress
 Tony Clarkin – actor of stage, TV, radio, film; voiceover artist
 Michael Colgan – actor
 Kerry Condon – actress
 D'Arcy Corrigan – Hollywood actor
 Nicola Coughlan – actress
 Catherine Cusack – stage and TV actor; daughter of Cyril Cusack
 Cyril Cusack – actor of stage, film and TV (born in South Africa)
 Niamh Cusack – TV actress; daughter of Cyril Cusack
 Sinéad Cusack – stage, film and TV actress; daughter of Cyril Cusack; married to Jeremy Irons
 Sorcha Cusack – film and TV actress; daughter of Cyril Cusack
 Daniel Day-Lewis – English-born Oscar winner
 Thomas Doggett – actor
 Alison Doody – actress, best known for her role in Indiana Jones and the Last Crusade
 Richard Dormer – actor, playwright, known for roles in "Game of Thrones" and "Fortitude"
 Jamie Dornan – actor and model; played the Huntsman in Once Upon a Time; best known for roles in The Fall and Fifty Shades of Grey
 Roma Downey – actor, best known for her role as Monica in the TV series Touched by an Angel
 Maria Doyle Kennedy – actress and singer
 Ada Dyas – actress
 Hilton Edwards – co-founder of the Gate Theatre, born in UK
 Colin Farrell – Hollywood actor
 Michael Fassbender – Hollywood actor, born in West Germany
 Al Ferguson – actor
 Barry Fitzgerald – Abbey Theatre actor turned Hollywood star
 Geraldine Fitzgerald – actress
 Fionnula Flanagan – actress
 Brenda Fricker – Oscar winner
 Bronagh Gallagher – actress
 Michael Gambon – theatre, TV and film actor, Harry Potter films
 Charles K. Gerrard – Hollywood actor
 Douglas Gerrard – Hollywood actor
 Aidan Gillen – actor, The Wire, Game of Thrones, Queer as Folk
 Brendan Gleeson – actor, Harry Potter films
 Brian Gleeson – actor
 Domhnall Gleeson – actor
 Creighton Hale – actor
 Louisa Harland – actress
 Richard Harris – actor, Harry Potter films
 Forrester Harvey – Hollywood actor
 Amy Joyce Hastings – actress
 Amy Huberman – actress
 Saoirse-Monica Jackson – actress
 Valene Kane – actress, The Fading Light
 David Kelly – actor
 J. M. Kerrigan – Abbey actor
 Joanne King – actress
 Dervla Kirwan – actress, Ballykissangel, Goodnight Sweetheart
 Evanna Lynch – actress, Harry Potter films
 Joe Lynch – TV actor
 John Lynch – actor
 Susan Lynch – actress
 Micheál Mac Liammhóir – co-founder of the Gate Theatre, born in UK
 Eoin Macken – actor, Merlin
 Gerard McCarthy – actor, Hollyoaks
 Sean McClory – actor 
 F. J. McCormick – Abbey actor
 Damian McGinty – TV actor Glee
 Patrick McGoohan – actor and creator of The Prisoner
 Barry McGovern – stage, film and TV actor
 Katie McGrath – film and TV actress
 Gerard McSorley – actor
 Colm Meaney – Hollywood actor
 Paul Mescal – actor
 Jonathan Rhys Meyers – film and TV actor
 Charles Mitchel – actor and newsreader
 Damien Molony – (stage and television actor)
 Colin Morgan – actor of stage, film and TV, best known for being the lead in Merlin
 Edward Mulhare – actor; played Captain Daniel Gregg in The Ghost and Mrs. Muir; Knight Rider
 Cillian Murphy – actor
 Devon Murray – actor, Seamus Finnigan in the Harry Potter movies
 Liam Neeson – actor
 Sam Neill – actor
 James Nesbitt – actor
 Jim Norton – character actor
 Jamie-Lee O'Donnell – actress
 Colin O'Donoghue – actor, member of The Enemies; best known for playing Captain Hook in Once Upon A Time
 Chris O'Dowd – actor and comedian
 Ardal O'Hanlon – actor and comedian
 Joan O'Hara – actress
 Maureen O'Hara – actress
 Jason O'Mara – actor
 Milo O'Shea – actor
 Maureen O'Sullivan – actor; mother of Mia Farrow
 Peter O'Toole – Oscar winner
 Daragh O'Malley – actor
 Glenn Quinn – actor
 Aidan Quinn – actor
 Stephen Rea – actor
 Jack Reynor – actor
 Paul Ronan – actor, The Devil's Own; father of Saoirse Ronan
 Saoirse Ronan – actress
 Andrew Scott – film, stage and television actor
 Fiona Shaw – actress, the Harry Potter movies
 Robert Sheehan – actor
 Arthur Shields – actor; younger brother of Barry Fitzgerald
 Niall Tóibín – actor and comedian
 Stuart Townsend – actor and boxer
 Aidan Turner – actor, played John Mitchell in the BBC's Being Human and Kili in The Hobbit: An Unexpected Journey
 Richard Wall – actor

Chefs 
 Darina Allen – Irish personality and TV chef
 Myrtle Allen – Irish chef, teacher and writer
 Rachel Allen – Irish celebrity chef
 Danni Barry
 Michael Bolster
 Rory Carville
 Richard Corrigan
 Matthew Darcy 
 Matt Dowling
 Kevin Dundon
 Oliver Dunne
 Catherine Healy
 Neven Maguire – Irish celebrity chef
 Clare Smyth

Comedians 

 Dave Allen
 Aisling Bea
 Ed Byrne
 Jimmy Carr
 Risteárd Cooper
 Neil Delamere
 PJ Gallagher
 Brendan Grace
 Sean Hughes
 Jon Kenny
 Denis Leary
 Andrew Maxwell
 Kevin McGahern
 Tim McGarry
 Seán William McLoughlin – YouTube personality (under the name Jacksepticeye), musician, game commentator
 Dylan Moran
 Dermot Morgan – comedian, actor, radio personality
 Colin Murphy
 Graham Norton
 Dara Ó Briain
 Brendan O'Carroll
 Ardal O'Hanlon
 Hector Ó hEochagáin
 Jimmy O'Dea
 David O'Doherty
 Deirdre O'Kane
 Jarlath Regan – comedian, journalist, interviewer, author, cartoonist 
 Mario Rosenstock – comedian, impressionist, actor, musician 
 Pat Shortt
 Tommy Tiernan
 Jackie Wright

Music

Music – A to C 
 Chloë Agnew – singer
 Iain Archer – singer-songwriter and producer
 Michael William Balfe – opera composer
 Gerald Barry – composer, member of Aosdána
 John K. Beatty – uillean piper
 Derek Bell – harpist
 Eric Bell – guitarist, Thin Lizzy
 Ed Bennett – composer
 Mary Bergin – tin whistler
 Big Tom – lead singer of Big Tom and The Mainliners
 Wallis Bird – singer-songwriter
 Frances Black – singer
 Mary Black – singer
 Seóirse Bodley – composer, Saoi of Aosdána
 Bono (Paul David Hewson) – lead singer of U2
 Ciarán Bourke – singer, guitarist
 Brian Boydell – composer
 Ina Boyle – composer
 Michael Bradley – bass player, songwriter, The Undertones
 Brídín Brennan – singer
 Moya Brennan – musician
 Enya Brennan – musician
 Niall Breslin – lead singer of The Blizzards
 John Buckley – composer
 Chris de Burgh – singer-songwriter, musician
 Joe Burke – accordionist
 Kevin Burke – fiddler
 Nicky Byrne – singer of Westlife, songwriter
 Eamonn Campbell – guitarist, producer
 Vivian Campbell – co-lead guitarist of Def Leppard, former Dio guitarist
 Seán Cannon – singer, guitarist
 Paddy Casey – singer-songwriter
 Patrick Cassidy – composer
 Mic Christopher – singer-songwriter
 Bobby Clancy – singer, banjo, guitar, harmonica, and bodhrán player
 Liam Clancy – singer, guitarist
 Paddy Clancy – singer, harmonica player
 Tom Clancy – singer
 Willie Clancy – uilleann piper
 Siobhán Cleary (born 1970) – composer
 Julia Clifford – traditional fiddle player
 Philip Cogan – composer
 Michael Coleman – fiddler
 Finghin Collins – pianist
 Brian Conway – fiddler 
 Tadhg Cooke – singer
 Frank Corcoran – composer
 Andrea Corr – singer from The Corrs
 Caroline Corr – drummer
 Jim Corr – guitarist
 Sharon Corr – fiddle player
 Phil Coulter – composer
 Nadine Coyle – singer

Music – D to K 
 Raymond Deane – composer
 Damien Dempsey – singer-songwriter
 Mike Denver – singer
 Joe Dolan – singer, entertainer 
 Ryan Dolan – singer-songwriter
 Brian Downey – drummer/Thin Lizzy
 Roger Doyle – composer
 Maria Doyle Kennedy – singer-songwriter, musician
 Ronnie Drew – singer, guitarist
 Keith Duffy – singer of Boyzone
 Hugo Duncan – singer
 Benjamin Dwyer – composer
 The Edge (David Howell Evans) – guitarist, singer of U2
 Kian Egan – singer of Westlife, songwriter
 Séamus Ennis – uilleann piper
 Enya – singer-songwriter
 Órla Fallon – singer, harpist
 Ciarán Farrell – composer
 Mark Feehily – singer of Westlife, songwriter
 Angela Feeney – opera singer
 John Field – composer; creator of the nocturne
 Shane Filan – singer of Westlife, songwriter
 Mick Flannery – singer-songwriter
 Aloys Fleischmann – composer and musicologist
 W. H. Grattan Flood – musicologist
 Dave Flynn – award-winning composer, guitarist and singer-songwriter
 Gavin Friday – singer
 Finbar Furey – singer-songwriter, uillean piper, 5-string banjo player, actor
 Rory Gallagher – blues/rock guitarist
 Sir James Galway – flautist
 Bobby Gardiner – accordionist
 Stephen Gately – singer of Boyzone
 Mark Geary – singer
 Thomas Augustine Geary – composer
 Bob Geldof – songwriter, singer of the Boomtown Rats, activist
 John William Glover – composer
 Len Graham – singer
 Michael Graham – singer of Boyzone
 Bernadette Greevy – mezzo-soprano
 John and Edward Grimes – X Factor 2009
 Marc Gunn – autoharpist, singer-songwriter, and podcaster, formerly of the Brobdingnagian Bards
 Carmel Gunning – tin whistler
 Lisa Hannigan – singer-songwriter
 Glen Hansard – Oscar-winning singer/songwriter
 Hamilton Harty – composer and arranger
 Catherine Hayes – opera singer
 Gemma Hayes – singer
 Una Healy – member of girl band The Saturdays
 Christie Hennessy – singer-songwriter
 Niall Horan – member of British-Irish boy band One Direction
 Hozier – musician and singer-songwriter
 Herbert Hughes – composer and arranger
 Red Hurley – singer
 Brian Irvine – composer
 Jolyon Jackson – composer musician
 Fergus Johnston – composer, member of Aosdána
 Dolores Keane – singer
 Bryan Kearney – trance DJ and producer
 Richard Kearns – classical composer
 Ronan Keating – singer-songwriter
 Paddy Keenan – uilleann piper
 Lisa Kelly – singer
 Luke Kelly – singer
 Michael Kelly – tenor and composer
 Brian Kennedy – singer
Dermot Kennedy – singer-songwriter
 Paddy Killoran – fiddler
 Katie Kim – singer-songwriter, musician
 Dave King – singer-songwriter
 John Kinsella – composer, member of Aosdána
 David Kitt – musician

Music – L to P 
 John F. Larchet – composer
 April Lawlor – singer-songwriter
 Damien Leith – singer-songwriter, winner of Australian Idol 2006
 Gary Lightbody – lead singer of Snow Patrol
 Josef Locke – singer
 Johnny Logan – singer-songwriter
 Samuel Lover – composer and performer
 Cora Venus Lunny – violinist
 Dónal Lunny – musician
 Bob Lynch (musician) – musician
 Shane Lynch – singer of Boyzone
 Phil Lynott – Thin Lizzy frontman
 Jimmy MacCarthy – singer-songwriter
 Mickey MacConnell – singer-songwriter
 Shane MacGowan – English-born singer-songwriter
 Sean Mackin – backup vocals and violinist of Yellowcard
 Sean Maguire – violinist
 Margo – singer
 Sarah Makem – singer
 Tommy Makem – singer-songwriter
 Enda Markey – singer
 Philip Martin – pianist, composer, member of Aosdána
 Gwendolyn Masin – violinist, author, pedagogue
 Larry Mathews – singer-songwriter, violinist
 Frederick May – composer
 Christopher McCafferty – underground club promoter, DJ
 Jim McCann (musician) – musician
 John Count McCormack – singer
 Eleanor McEvoy – singer-songwriter
 Brian McFadden – singer-songwriter
 Damian McGinty – Celtic Thunder; played Rory Flanagan on Glee
 Matt McGinn – Irish singer-songwriter
 Michael McGlynn – composer, arranger, choir director
 Geraldine McGowan – folk singer
 Barney McKenna – banjo player
 Susan McKeown – Grammy Award-winning vocalist and songwriter
 Geraldine McMahon – harpist
 Paul McSherry – guitarist
 James Lynam Molloy – ballad composer
 Christy Moore – singer-songwriter
 Gary Moore – guitarist, singer-songwriter
 Peter K. Moran – composer
 Van Morrison – singer-songwriter
 Lee Mulhern – singer-songwriter
 Gráinne Mulvey – composer
 Samantha Mumba – singer, actress
 Mundy – singer-songwriter
 John Murphy – fiddle player
 Róisín Murphy – singer
 Ruby Murray – singer
 Máiréad Nesbitt – fiddler
 Méav Ní Mhaolchatha – singer
 Mairéad Ní Mhaonaigh – musician
 Eithne Ní Uallacháin – singer
 Pádraigín Ní Uallacháin – singer
 John O’Callaghan – musician
 Turlough O'Carolan – 17th/18th-century harper and composer
 Colm Ó Cíosóig – musician, drummer of My Bloody Valentine
 Maura O'Connell – singer
 Máirtín O'Connor – accordionist
 Sinéad O'Connor – singer
 Daniel O'Donnell – country-and-western singer
 Danny O'Donoghue – lead singer of The Script 
 Robert O'Dwyer – composer
 Liam O'Flynn – uilleann piper
 Kane O'Hara – composer
 Mary O'Hara – harpist/singer
 Mícheál Ó hEidhin – musician
 Arthur O'Leary – composer
 Jane O'Leary – composer and pianist
 Damian O'Neill – lead guitarist of The Undertones
 John O'Neill – guitarist of The Undertones; writer of Teenage Kicks
 Seán Ó Riada – composer and musician
 Annmarie O'Riordan – singer-songwriter
 Dolores O'Riordan – singer-songwriter, guitarist
 George Alexander Osborne – composer
 Gilbert O'Sullivan – pop singer-songwriter, pianist
 Una Palliser – violinist, violist, singer
 Geoffrey Molyneux Palmer – composer
 Luan Parle – singer-songwriter, musician
 Tommy Peoples – fiddler
 Brendan Phelan – songwriter
 A. J. Potter – composer

Music – Q to Z 
 Carmel Quinn – singer
 Paddy Reilly – singer/guitarist
 Damien Rice – singer-songwriter
 Thomas Roseingrave – composer
 Leo Rowsome – uilleann piper
 Derek Ryan
 Frank Ryan – tenor
 Dana Rosemary Scallon – MEP-singer turned politician
 Sharon Shannon – traditional musician
 Feargal Sharkey – lead singer of The Undertones
 John Sheahan – fiddler
 Mark Sheehan – guitarist of The Script
 Kevin Shields – musician, vocalist and guitarist of My Bloody Valentine
 Chris Singleton – singer-songwriter
 Donal Skehan – singer
 Carly Smithson – singer
 Charles Villiers Stanford – composer
 Robert Prescott Stewart – composer and organist
 Patsy Touhey – piper
 Joan Trimble – composer and pianist
 Paddy Tunney – singer
 VerseChorusVerse – musician and singer-songwriter, pseudonym of Tony Wright
 Gerard Victory – composer
 Kevin Volans – composer
 William Vincent Wallace – composer
 Jennifer Walshe – composer and performer
 Patsy Watchorn – musician
 Liam Weldon – singer-songwriter
 Bill Whelan – composer
 Andy White – singer-songwriter
 Colm Wilkinson – singer
 Ian Wilson – composer
 James Wilson – composer
 Charles Wood – composer
 Terry Woods – musician
 Richard Woodward – composer and organist
 Finbar Wright – singer-songwriter

Dance 
 Breandán de Gallaí – Irish dancer
 Joanne Doyle – Irish dancer
 Monica Loughman – ballet
 Tristan MacManus – ballroom and Latin dancer, Dancing with the Stars, US season 13
 Lola Montez (Eliza Gilbert) – dancer, courtesan
 Dame Ninette de Valois – ballet
 Bill Whelan – composer

Writing

Writing – A to C 

 Cecelia Ahern 
 William Allingham – poet
 John Banville – novelist
 George Barrington
 Sebastian Barry – novelist
 Samuel Beckett  – novelist, playwright, theatre director, poet, author of Waiting for Godot  and Nobel laureate
 Brendan Behan – playwright, novelist
 Maeve Binchy – novelist
 Dermot Bolger – novelist
 Patrick Brontë – poet
 Stephen Brown – writer, bibliographer
 J. B. Bury – historian
 William Carleton – novelist
 Austin Clarke
 Josephine Fitzgerald Clarke – author
 Brian Cleeve – author
 Brian Coffey – poet
 Eoin Colfer – author
 Laura Angela Collins – author 
 Frederick William Conway – editor and journalist
 Eoghan Corry – journalist and author
 Sister Margaret Anna Cusack – the "Nun of Kenmare", patriot and controversialist

Writing – D to K 
 Thomas Osborne Davis – writer, poet
 Seamus Deane – Aosdána
 Patrick Deeley – poet
 Eamon Delaney
 Frank Delaney
 Greg Delanty – poet
 Denis Devlin – poet
 Roddy Doyle – novelist
 Margaretta Eagar – memoirist
 Garth Ennis – comic writer
 Sir Samuel Ferguson – poet
 Roderick Flanagan – historian
 Philip Flattisbury – compiler
 Brian Friel – playwright, Aosdána
 Oliver St. John Gogarty
 Oliver Goldsmith – novelist and dramatist
 Augusta, Lady Gregory – playwright and founder of the Abbey Theatre
 Hugo Hamilton – author
 Dermot Healy – Aosdána
 Randolph Healy – poet
 Seamus Heaney – Saoi of Aosdána, Poet and Nobel laureate
 Aidan Higgins – Aosdána
 Anthony Holten – author
 Pat Ingoldsby – poet, playwright, television performer
 Jennifer Johnston – Aosdána
 Neil Jordan – author, film director, Aosdána
 James Joyce – novelist, author of Ulysses
 Trevor Joyce – poet
 Herminie Templeton Kavanagh – author
 Patrick Kavanagh – poet
 John B. Keane – playwright, novelist and essayist 
 Benedict Kiely – Saoi of Aosdána
 Caitlín R. Kiernan – American novelist and paleontologist
 Anatoly Kudryavitsky – poet

Writing – L to P 
Derek Landy – Skulduggery Pleasant series
 Mary Lavin – Saoi of Aosdána
 Joseph Sheridan Le Fanu – gothic novelist
 Francis Ledwidge – poet
 C. S. Lewis – author of the Chronicles of Narnia
 Michael Longley – Aosdána
 Seosamh Mac Grianna – Gaelic author
 Oliver MacDonagh – historian
 Walter Macken – novelist
 James Clarence Mangan – poet
 Malachi Martin – horror writer
 Edward Martyn – playwright, art patron and political activist
 Frank McCourt – writer
 Martin McDonagh – playwright
 Hugh McFadden – poet and critic
 John McGahern – novelist, Aosdána
 Lisa McGee – playwright, screenwriter, creator of Derry Girls
 Frank McGuinness – Aosdána
 Paula Meehan – poet
 John Montague – poet
 Thomas Moore – poet
 Paul Muldoon – poet
 Richard Murphy – poet, Aosdána
 Nuala Ni Dhomhnaill – poet
 Christopher Nolan – poet, Aosdána
 Edna O'Brien – novelist, Aosdána
 Seán O'Casey – playwright
 Frank O'Connor – short story writer
 Ulick O'Connor – Aosdána
 Máirtín Ó Direáin – Irish-language poet, Aosdána
 Peadar O'Donnell – novelist, autobiographer and revolutionary
 Harry O'Donovan – scriptwriter
 Dennis O'Driscoll – poet
 Seán Ó Faoláin – Saoi of Aosdána
 Liam O'Flaherty – novelist, short story writer
 Finghin O Mathghamhna – medieval translator and scribe 
 Brian O'Nolan (aka Myles na gCopaleen – Flann O'Brien) – novelist, columnist
 Philip O'Sullivan Beare – writer, historian
 James Plunkett – Aosdána
 Katherine Purdon – Irish writer

Writing – R to Z 
 Sally Rooney – novelist, screenwriter 
 Gabriel Rosenstock – poet
 George William Russell –  writer and critic
 Michael Scott – novelist, screenwriter, folklorist, author of The Secrets of the Immortal Nicholas Flamel
 Maurice Scully – poet
 Darren Shan – novelist, author of The Saga of Darren Shan
 George Bernard Shaw  – novelist, playwright, author of Pygmalion and Nobel laureate
 John D. Sheridan – short story writer and humorist
 Richard Brinsley Sheridan – playwright
 James Simmons – poet
 Michael Smith – poet
 Paul Smith – novelist, playwright
 Annie M. P. Smithson – novelist
 Geoffrey Squires – poet
 Laurence Sterne  – novelist, author of Tristram Shandy
 Bram Stoker – author of Dracula
 Francis Stuart – Saoi of Aosdána
 Jonathan Swift – Dean of St Patrick's Cathedral, Dublin, novelist and satirist, author of Gulliver's Travels
 John Millington Synge – dramatist
 William Trevor – writer, Aosdána
 William Wall – novelist, poet
 Oscar Wilde  – novelist, poet, satirist, author of The Picture of Dorian Gray
 Macdara Woods – poet
 Maev-Ann Wren – writer
 William Butler Yeats – poet, playwright and Nobel laureate

Business 
 Donie Cassidy – businessman and TD
 Elaine Coughlan – venture capitalist
 Bill Cullen – businessman, philanthropist and media personality
 Niall FitzGerald – honorary KBE, chief executive of Unilever
 James Gamble – co-founder of Procter & Gamble
 Arthur Guinness – brewer
Sarah Keane – CEO of Swim Ireland and President of the Olympic Federation of Ireland
 Pat McDonagh – founder of Supermac's
 J. P. McManus – businessman
 Margaret Molloy – businesswoman
 Denis O'Brien – businessman
 Michael O'Leary – CEO of Ryanair
 Anthony J F O'Reilly – Independent Newspapers and head of Heinz, 1979–1996
 David J. O'Reilly – CEO of Chevron
 Tony Ryan – founder of Ryanair and Guinness Peat Aviation
 Peter Sutherland – Chairman of BP Plc; Chairman of Goldman Sachs International; Ireland's representative at the European Commission

Science, education and technology 

 Robert Adrain (1775–1843) – scientist, mathematician and United Irishman
 Thomas Andrews (1813–1885) – chemist and physicist
 Francis Beaufort (1774–1857) – hydrographer, developed a scale for classifying wind strength
 John Stewart Bell (1928–1990) – atomic physicist, 'Bell's Inequalities'
 John Desmond Bernal (1901–1971) – X-ray crystallography
 George Boole (1815–1864) – Boolean Algebra, Digital Logic
 Robert Boyle (1627–1691) – physicist, 'Boyle's law'
 Louis Brennan (1852–1932) – principle of a guided missile, wire-guided torpedo
 Pádraig de Brún (1889–1960) – scholar and mathematician
 Lucien Bull (1876–1972) – high speed photography, modern electrocardiogram (ECG)
 Jocelyn Bell Burnell (born 1943) – discovered pulsars
 Nicholas Callan (1799–1864) – inventor of the induction coil and discoverer the principle of the dynamo
 Aeneas Coffey (1780–1852) – heat exchanger, inventor of the column still
 William Monad Crawford – entomologist
 William Dargan – railway engineer
 David Doak (born 1967) – scientist, video game developer and entrepreneur
 Frederick G. Donnan – chemist
 Michael Everson – expert in writing systems and Unicode, born in the U.S.
 Wentworth Erck – astronomer, poor-law guardian and magistrate
 Harry Ferguson – engineer, designer of the modern farm tractor, inventor of the three-point hitch
 George FitzGerald (1851–1901) – theoretical physicist, 'FitzGerald-Lorentz Contraction'
 Patrick Ganly (1809–1899) – geologist; described the use of cross-bedding in stratification
 John Robert Gregg (1868–1948) – Gregg shorthand system
 William Rowan Hamilton – mathematician, astronomer and mathematical physicist
 Áine Hardiman – nun, headteacher, anti-apartheid activist
 John Philip Holland (1841–1914) – submarine designer
 Ellen Hutchins (1785–1815) – botanist
 John Joly (1857–1933) – photometer, colour photography
 Sindy Joyce – education  
 Richard Kirwan (1733–1812) – meteorologist
 Alice Lawrenson, (1841–1900) –  botanical writer and gardener
 Kathleen Lonsdale (1903–1971) – crystallographer
 Percy Ludgate (1883–1922) – designer of the second Analytical Engine
 Kathleen Lynn (1874–1955) – one of the first female medical doctors in Ireland, politician and activist 
 Robert Mallet (1810–1881) – seismology
 Alexander Mitchell (1780–1868) – lighthouse and marine engineer
Dervilla Mitchell – engineer
 Hannah Moylan (1867–1902) – first woman to get a degree in Science in Ireland
 Robert Murphy (1806–1843) – mathematician and physicist
 Richard O'Keefe – computer scientist
 Frank Pantridge (1916–2004) – inventor of the mobile defibrillator
 Dorothy Price (1890–1954) – physician who introduced the BCG tuberculosis vaccine to Ireland
 Patricia Redlich (1940–2011) – clinical psychologist
 Sir George Stokes, 1st Baronet (1819–1903) – mathematician, physicist, 'Stokes Theorem' and Stokes-Navier Equations'
 George Johnstone Stoney (1826–1911) – atomic physicist, named the electron and measured its charge
 John Lighton Synge (1897–1995) – mathematician
 William Thomson, Lord Kelvin (1824–1907) – physicist
 John Tyndall (1820–1893) – physicist
 Ernest Walton (1903–1995) – physicist, 1951 Nobel Prize in Physics
 Mary Ward (1827–1869) – microscopist
 John Richardson Wigham (1829–1906) – inventor and lighthouse engineer
 Thomas Wynne (1942–2005) – inventor, mechanic and engineer

Sport 

 Francie Barrett – professional boxer
 George Best – soccer player (Northern Ireland)
 John Pius Boland – double Olympic medal-winner, tennis, 1896
 Packie Bonner – soccer player
 Andre Botha – cricketer
 Jeremy Bray – cricketer
 Andrew Bree – swimmer
 Tommy Byrne – racing driver
 Kenny Carroll – cricketer
 Michael Carruth – Olympic gold medal winner, boxing
 Tony Cascarino – soccer player
 Eamonn Coghlan – runner
 Séamus Coleman – footballer
 Enda Colleran – Gaelic footballer, member of the Football Team of the Millennium
 Ray Cummins – member of the hurling Team of the Millennium
 Liam Daish – soccer player
 Derek Daly – racing driver
 Gordon D'Arcy – rugby union player
 Paul Darragh – showjumper
 Ron Delany – Olympic medal winner/athletics
 Fergal Devitt – WWE wrestler
 Ken Doherty – World Professional Billiards and Snooker Association champion
 John Doyle – member of the hurling Team of the Millennium
 Mick Doyle – rugby union player
 Damien Duff – soccer player
 Richard Dunne – soccer player
 Joey Dunlop – motorcycle racer, 26 times Isle of Man TT race winner
 Eamon Dunphy – soccer player, media commentator and broadcaster
 Kieran Dynes – NASCAR driver
 Shay Elliott – professional cyclist
 Jonny Evans – Northern Irish footballer
 Stephen Farrelly – WWE wrestler
 Dave Finlay – WWE wrestler
 Ciaran Fitzgerald – rugby union player; British and Irish Lions captain
 Seán Flanagan – Gaelic footballer, member of the Football Team of the Millennium
 Sharon Foley – track and field athlete
 Carl Frampton – boxer
 Frankie Fullen – soccer player
 Mick Galwey – rugby player
 Edmond Gibney – equestrian
 Darron Gibson – soccer player
 Johnny Giles – soccer player
 Peter Gillespie – cricketer
 Shay Given – soccer player
 Pádraig Harrington – golfer and three time Golf Majors winner
 Elizabeth Hawkins-Whitshed – 19th-century mountaineer
 David Healy – soccer player (Northern Ireland)
 Kevin Heffernan – Gaelic footballer, member of the Football Team of the Millennium
 Robert Heffernan – Irish race walker and Olympic medalist
 Denis Hickie – rugby union player
 Alex Higgins – Snooker player
 Ray Houghton – soccer player
 Denis Irwin – soccer player
 Trent Johnston – cricketer
 Eddie Jordan – racing driver and Formula 1 team owner
 John Keane – member of the hurling Team of the Millennium
 Robbie Keane – soccer player
 Roy Keane – soccer player
 Eddie Keher – member of the hurling Team of the Millennium
 Joe Kelly – racing driver
 Seán Kelly – road cyclist
 David Kennedy – racing driver
 Joe Keohane – Gaelic footballer, member of the Football Team of the Millennium
 Kevin Kilbane – soccer player
 Michael Kinane – jockey
 Ham Lambert – rugby union and cricket player
 Tommy Langan – Gaelic footballer, member of the Football Team of the Millennium
 Dave Langford-Smith – cricketer
 Jim Langton – member of the hurling Team of the Millennium
 Liam Lawrence – soccer player for Shrewsbury Town FC and Republic of Ireland international
 Alan Lewis – rugby union referee
 Becky Lynch – WWE wrestler
 Jack Lynch – member of the hurling Team of the Millennium, politician
 Eddie Macken – horse showjumper
 Mick Mackey – member of the hurling Team of the Millennium
 Owen Madden – soccer player
 Dan Marten – cyclist
 Dave McAuley – boxer
 Kevin McBride – boxer
 Willie John McBride – rugby union player and British and Irish Lions captain
 Kyle McCallan – cricketer
 David McCann – cyclist
 Mick McCarthy – soccer player and Republic of Ireland soccer manager
 Wayne McCullough – Olympic silver medalist; WBC World Boxing Champion
 Paul McGinley – golfer
 Owen Roe McGovern – Gaelic football player for Cavan; an All-Ireland player
 Paul McGrath – soccer player
 Conor McGregor – mixed martial artist
 Barry McGuigan – world featherweight boxing champion
 Rory McIlroy – golfer
 Catherina McKiernan – track and field athlete
 Jimmy McLarnin – boxer
 Lory Meagher – member of the hurling Team of the Millennium
 Jason Molins – cricketer
 John Mooney – cricketer
 Paul Mooney – cricketer
 Eoin Morgan – cricketer
 Geordan Murphy – rugby union player
 Seán Murphy – Gaelic footballer, member of the Football Team of the Millennium
 Tommy Murphy – Gaelic footballer, member of the Football Team of the Millennium
 Owen Nolan – hockey player
 Kevin O'Brien – cricketer
 Aiden O'Brien – soccer player
 Niall O'Brien – cricketer
 Vincent O'Brien – voted greatest horse trainer of all time by Racing Post
 Pat O'Callaghan – Olympic gold medal, hammer, 1928, 1932
 Martin O'Connell – Gaelic footballer, member of the Football Team of the Millennium
 Mick O'Connell – Gaelic footballer, member of the Football Team of the Millennium
 Patrick O'Connell – Real Betis/FC Barcelona manager, 1930s
 Paul O'Connell – rugby union player and British and Irish Lions captain
 Cian O'Connor – show jumper who had Olympic gold medal taken from him
 Shane O'Connor – Alpine skier, Olympian 2010
 Christopher O'Donnell – track and field sprinter
 Nick O'Donnell – member of the hurling Team of the Millennium
 Brian O'Driscoll – rugby union player and British and Irish Lions captain
 Ronan O'Gara – rugby union player
 Dan O'Keeffe – Gaelic footballer, member of the Football Team of the Millennium
 Malcolm O'Kelly – rugby union player
 Jonjo O'Neill – jockey
 Seán O'Neill – Gaelic footballer, member of the Football Team of the Millennium
 Joan O'Reilly – international hockey player
 J. J. O'Reilly – Gaelic footballer, member of the Football Team of the Millennium
 Derval O'Rourke – World Indoor Champion and European silver medalist
 John O'Shea – soccer player
 Peter O'Sullevan – horse racing commentator
 Eddie O'Sullivan – rugby union coach
 Gillian O'Sullivan – World Championships silver medalist
 Sonia O'Sullivan – Olympic silver medalist
 Michael Phelan – billiards
 Paddy Phelan – member of the hurling Team of the Millennium
 William Porterfield – cricketer
 Seán Purcell – Gaelic footballer, member of the Football Team of the Millennium
 Niall Quinn – soccer player
 Bobby Rackard – member of the hurling Team of the Millennium
 Boyd Rankin – cricketer
 Tony Reddin – member of the hurling Team of the Millennium
 Christy Ring – member of the hurling Team of the Millennium
 Nicolas Roche – cyclist
 Stephen Roche – road cyclist
 Michael Roe – racing driver
 Alain Rolland – rugby union player and referee
 Glenn Ross – Strongman
 Mark Scanlon – cyclist
 Tom Sharkey – boxer
 Mikey Sheehy – Gaelic footballer, member of the Football Team of the Millennium
 Andrew Slattery – rally car driver* Michelle Smith – multi gold medalist 1996 Olympics
 Des Smyth – golfer
 Dr. Bethel Solomons – rugby union player,  national team, Olympic team silver
 Pat Spillane – Gaelic footballer, member of the Football Team of the Millennium
 Steve Staunton – soccer player
 Jim Stynes – champion Australian rules footballer
 Katie Taylor – boxer, Irish, European, World and Olympic champion in the 60 kg division. Olympic Gold Medalist (2012)
 Bob Tisdall – Olympic gold medal, 400mH, 1932
 John Treacy – Olympic silver medal, marathon, 1984
 Ruby Walsh – jockey
 Brian Whelahan – member of the hurling Team of the Millennium
 Glenn Whelan – soccer player
 Ronnie Whelan – soccer player
 Andrew White – cricketer
 Norman Whiteside – Northern Irish footballer
 Joe Wickham – President of the Football Association of Ireland and soccer player
 Keith Wood – rugby union player

TV and Radio 
 Eamonn Andrews – television personality, producer and businessman
 Amanda Byram – broadcaster
 Gay Byrne – broadcaster and presenter of The Late Late Show (1962–1999)
 Matt Cooper – broadcaster and journalist
 Ray D'arcy – broadcaster
 Ian Dempsey – television presenter
 Anne Doyle – journalist and broadcaster
 Joe Duffy – radio broadcaster
 Eamonn Holmes – journalist and broadcaster 
 Pat Kenny – broadcaster and journalist
 Eoghan McDermott
 Graham Norton – comedian, TV host & actor
 Brendan O'Connor – journalist and broadcaster
 Bill O Herlihy – Raidió Teilifís Éireann broadcaster
 Seamus O'Regan – politician, television personality, and host of CTV's Canada AM, born in Newfoundland, Canada
 Ray Shah – DJ and radio personality
 Kathryn Thomas – Operation Transformation host and broadcaster
 Ryan Tubridy – 'The Late Late Show' host   (2009- ), broadcaster and writer
 Louis Walsh – music manager and television personality
 Laura Whitmore – television presenter
 Terry Wogan – broadcaster

Saints
 Saint Patrick (1 of the 3 Patron saints of Ireland)
 Aidan of Lindisfarne
 Saint Brigid (1 of the 3 Patron saints of Ireland)
 Saint Brendan
 Saint Caomhán
 Saint Columba (Irish: Colmcille) (1 of 3 Patron saints of Ireland)
 Saint Dymphna
 Saint Enda (Irish: Éanna)
 Saint Kevin (Irish: Caomhín)
 Saint Lorcán

Others 
 Anne Anderson – Irish Ambassador to the United States
 Todd Andrews – civil servant
 Alfred Chester Beatty – mining magnate
 George Berkeley – philosopher
 Brian Boru – 11th-century high-king of Ireland
 Seán Brady – Roman Catholic Archbishop of Armagh and Primate of All Ireland
 Brigh Brigaid – 1st-century Irish judge
 Brigid of Kildare – Irish saint and bishop
 William Brown – Irish-born Argentine Admiral
 Frank E. Butler – marksman
 Edmund Burke – philosopher and politician 
 Graham Cantwell – director
 Edward Carson – Lord Carson, barrister and politician
 Nellie Cashman – gold prospector in the United States; born in County Cork
 Cheiro – astrologer
 Harry Clarke – stained glass artist
 Michael Collins (Irish leader) – Irish revolutionary leader and politician.
 Ruaidrí Ua Conchobair – 12th-century high-king of Ireland
 Desmond Connell – Roman Catholic Cardinal of Ireland
 James Craig – Viscount Craigavon, politician
 Tom Crean – explorer
 Rosanna Davison – Miss World 2003
 Moya Doherty – impresario
 Bishop James Doyle – bishop
 Jim Duffy – Irish advisor to Australia's Republic Advisory Committee
 Margaretta Eagar – Limerick-born governess to the last Russian royal family
 Robin Eames – Church of Ireland Archbishop of Armagh and Primate of All Ireland
 Johannes Scotus Eriugena – theologian (born 810)
 Brendan Finucane – fighter pilot for the Royal Air Force
 Michael Anthony Fleming – Bishop of St. John's, Newfoundland and Labrador
 Eileen Flynn – Senator  
 Brian Gibbons – Welsh politician
 Glenda Gilson – model
 Veronica Guerin – journalist, murdered by drug dealers in 1996
 Mary, Lady Heath – early aviator
 Sir William Johnson, 1st Baronet – pioneer settler of America
 Peter Lacy – Russian field marshal
 James Larkin – labour leader
 Samantha Lewthwaite – terrorism suspect
 Eliza Lynch – mistress of Francisco Solano López, Paraguayan dictator
 Annette Elizabeth Mahon (1918–2013) – only Irish women in the ATA during World War II
 Catherine McAuley – founder the Sisters of Mercy
 Dubhaltach Mac Fhirbhisigh – scribe, translator, historian and genealogist
 Edward MacLysaght – Chief Herald of Ireland, 1943–1954
 Martin Maher – cadet instructor at the United States Military Academy
 Diarmuid Martin – Roman Catholic Archbishop of Dublin and Primate of Ireland
 Edward Martyn – co-founder of the Irish Literary Theatre
 Kevin McClory – screenwriter, producer and director
 John McKenna – Liverpool FC manager
 Seán William McLoughlin (AKA Jacksepticeye) – YouTube personality
 Michael Mills – ombudsman and political journalist
 Annie Moore – first person to pass through Ellis Island immigration system
 John Moore – director
 Lord Killanin – head of the International Olympic Committee
 Kevin Murphy – Ombudsman and Information Commissioner
 May O'Callaghan – Irish suffragette and communist
 Pat O'Connor – director
 Patricia O'Brien – United Nations Under-Secretary-General for Legal Affairs and United Nations Legal Counsel, Irish Ambassador to Geneva
 Seosamh Ó Duibhginn – writer, editor, publisher, Republican, and Gaelic language activist
 Gráinne O'Malley – pirate queen 
 Emily O'Reilly – journalist, ombudsman and Information Commissioner
 Jon Riley – major in the Saint Patrick's Battalion of the Mexican Army
 Katharine O'Shea – mistress of Charles Stewart Parnell
 Ian Paisley – Lord Paisley, Northern Irish politician
 Saint Patrick – Irish patron saint
 Margaret Phelan – founder of the Kilkenny Archeological Society
 Horace Plunkett – founder of co-operative movement
 Jane Wyse Power – Irish activist, feminist, politician and businesswoman
 Phoebe Prince – victim of bullycide
 Robert Ross – British Army officer during the Napoleonic Wars
 Mary Ryan – first woman in Ireland or Great Britain to be appointed Professor in a University
 Ernest Shackleton – explorer
 William Petty, 2nd Earl of Shelburne – British Prime Minister
 Gerard Slevin – Chief Herald of Ireland, 1954–1981
 Timothy Smiddy – academic, economist, Ireland's first ambassador
 Lisa Smith
 Olivia Taaffe – founder of St Joseph's Young Priests Society
 Launt Thompson – famous American sculptor from Abbeyleix, County Laois
 Mary Catherine Tinney – first female Irish ambassador (to Sweden)
 Thomas Joseph Tormey – Garda Síochána officer
 Sarah Travers – BBC Newsline newsreader; attended Dominican College; lives in Portstewart
 Philip Treacy – milliner
 David Trimble – Lord Trimble, Northern Irish politician
 Peter Tyndall – ombudsman
 Arthur Wellesley, 1st Duke of Wellington – Field Marshal (defeated Napoleon at Battle of Waterloo), Commander-in-Chief of the British Army and British Prime Minister
 Mary Whelan – Irish diplomat, appointed ambassador to Austria in 2014

See also 
List of Cork people
List of Donegal people
List of Dublin people
List of Galway people
List of Kilkenny people
List of Limerick people
List of Meath people
List of Sligo people
List of Waterford people

Further References